Each "article" in this category is a collection of entries about several stamp issuers, presented in alphabetical order. The entries are formulated on the micro model and so provide summary information about all known issuers.

See the :Category:Compendium of postage stamp issuers page for details of the project.

Zadar 

Refer 	Dalmatia (German Occupation)

Z. Afr. Republiek 

Refer 	South African Republic

Zaire 

Dates 	1971 –
Capital 	Kinshasa
Currency 	100 sengi = 1 kuta; 100 kuta = 1 zaire

Main Article Needed 

Includes 	Congo Republic (Zaire);
		Katanga;
		South Kasai

Zákinthos 

Refer 	Zante (German Occupation)

Zambezia 

Dates 	1894 – 1917
Capital 	Quelimane
Currency 	1000 réis = 1 mil réis

Refer 	Mozambique Territories

Zambia 

Dates 	1964 –
Capital 	Lusaka
Currency 	(1964) 12 pence = 1 shilling; 20 shillings = 1 pound
		(1968) 100 ngwee = 1 kwacha

Main Article Postage stamps and postal history of Zambia

See also 	Northern Rhodesia

Zante (German Occupation) 

Dates 	1943 – 1945
Capital  	Zákinthos
Currency  	100 centesimi = 1 lira

Refer  	German Occupation Issues (WW2)

See also 	Ionian Islands (Italian Occupation)

Zanzibar 

Dates 	1895 – 1967
Capital 	Zanzibar
Currency 	(1895) 16 annas = 1 rupee
		(1908) 100 cents = 1 rupee
		(1936) 100 cents = 1 shilling

Main Article Postage stamps and postal history of Zanzibar

See also 	Kenya Uganda & Tanzania (Combined Issues);
		Tanzania

Zanzibar (French Post Office) 

Dates 	January 16, 1889 – July 31, 1904
Currency  	16 annas = 1 rupee

Refer  	French Post Offices Abroad

Zanzibar (German Postal Agency) 

Dates 	1890 – 1891
Currency  	100 pfennige = 1 mark

Refer  	German Post Offices Abroad

Zar

Refer 	South African Republic

Zil Eloigne Sesel 

Refer 	Zil Elwannyen Sesel

Zil Elwagne Sesel 

Refer 	Zil Elwannyen Sesel

Zil Elwannyen Sesel 

Dates 	1980 –
Capital 	
Currency 	100 cents = 1 rupee

Main Article Needed 

See also 	British Indian Ocean Territory;
		Seychelles

Zimbabwe 

Dates 	1980 –
Capital 	Harare (Salisbury)
Currency 	100 cents = 1 dollar

Main Article Postage stamps and postal history of Zimbabwe

See also 	Rhodesia

Zuid Afrikaansche Republiek 

Refer 	ZAR

Zuidwest Afrika 

Refer 	South West Africa

Zululand 

Dates 	1888 – 1897
Capital 	Eshowe
Currency 	12 pence = 1 shilling; 20 shillings = 1 pound

Main Article Needed 

See also 	Natal

Zurich 

Dates 	1843 – 1850
Currency 	100 rappen = 1 franken

Refer 	Swiss Cantonal Issues

References

Bibliography
 Stanley Gibbons Ltd, Europe and Colonies 1970, Stanley Gibbons Ltd, 1969
 Stanley Gibbons Ltd, various catalogues
 Stuart Rossiter & John Flower, The Stamp Atlas, W H Smith, 1989
 XLCR Stamp Finder and Collector's Dictionary, Thomas Cliffe Ltd, c.1960

External links
 AskPhil – Glossary of Stamp Collecting Terms
 Encyclopaedia of Postal History

Zadar